Timothy Cole Gallaudet is an American oceanographer who is a retired Rear Admiral in the United States Navy. Gallaudet previously served as the Assistant Secretary of Commerce for Oceans and Atmosphere within the U.S. Department of Commerce. In this function, he fulfilled the role of Acting Under Secretary of Commerce for Oceans and Atmosphere and Acting Administrator of the National Oceanic and Atmospheric Administration (NOAA) until February 24, 2019. He was the longest-tenured Acting Administrator of NOAA in the organization's history at the time he was replaced, but was subsequently surpassed by his successor, Neil Jacobs. Currently, he is the CEO of Ocean STL Consulting, LLC., and host of The American Blue Economy Podcast.

Early life and education
Gallaudet was born on March 18, 1967, in Hollywood, California. He attended the United States Naval Academy and was awarded a bachelor of science degree in oceanography and was commissioned as an ensign in the United States Navy in 1989. After leaving Annapolis, Gallaudet went directly to the Scripps Institution of Oceanography for two years of post graduate studies, and was awarded a master of science degree in oceanography in 1991. For the next six years, Gallaudet served in various naval assignments before he returned to Scripps for his doctoral studies in 1997 under the direction of Christian de Moustier. He received his Ph.D. in 2001 before returning to active duty.

Gallaudet holds a bachelor's degree from the United States Naval Academy and master's and doctoral degrees from the Scripps Institution of Oceanography, all in oceanography.

Naval service
Prior to his role at NOAA, Gallaudet served as Oceanographer of the Navy and Commander of the Naval Meteorology and Oceanography Command. He has experience in weather and ocean forecasting, hydrographic surveying, developing policy and plans to counter illegal, unregulated, and unreported fishing, and assessing the national security impacts of climate change.

Directly following his receipt of an M.S. in oceanography from the Scripps Institution of Oceanography, Gallaudet served on several tours around Bahrain, Italy, and California aboard the USNS Harkness, USS LaSalle, USS Peleliu and at the Naval European Meteorology and Oceanography Detachment/Center of Greece and Spain. He planned and participated in hydrography surveys, lead weather and ocean forecasting efforts, directed ship movements and operations as Officer of the Deck and briefly served as assistant fleet oceanographer to the senior oceanographer on the staff of the commander of the U.S. 6th Fleet.

After returning to Scripps for his Ph.D. in oceanography, Gallaudet served for 2 years aboard the  based out of Yokosuka, Japan. Here, he served as officer of the deck, directing all aircraft carrier movements and aircraft launches and recoveries; Meteorology and Oceanography Division Officer, where he led personnel in forecasting weather and sea conditions for the KITTY HAWK Carrier Strike Group (CSG) and 5 escort ships which conducted the first strikes into Afghanistan during Operation Enduring Freedom; and conducted the first strikes into Iraq during Operation Iraqi Freedom.  

From 2003-2005, Gallaudet served under Commander, Naval Meteorology and Oceanography Command at Stennis Space Center in Mississippi as the plans and programs officer, where he oversaw the budget and plans for a highly classified unmanned underwater program executed at a subordinate command (Naval Oceanographic Office). He then served as the program manager for Anti-submarine warfare (ASW), coordinating the undersea data collection of 8 Oceanographic Survey Ships deployed worldwide, the processing of this data into geophysical databases used by Navy ships, aircraft, and submarines to operate their sonars/sonobuoys effectively, and direct teams of deploying military and civilian personnel to advise these units during ASW exercises and operations. After Katrina hit, he and his family moved to California where he became the commanding officer of the Naval Oceanography Special Warfare Center.  In this role, he established the first Navy SEAL program for unmanned aerial and underwater vehicles and other sensors to detect and locate enemy forces; he then headed a team of 120 personnel who deployed with U.S. Navy SEAL teams in Iraq, Afghanistan, Africa, and Southeast Asia to perform these actions. 

In 2008, Gallaudet and his family relocated to Washington, D.C. where he served on the Chief of Naval Operations Staff as Deputy Navigator of the Navy, and within this role assisted in managing a 5-year budget of $1.6B for directing all policy, research, development, and integration of navigation equipment on all Navy ships, submarines, and aircraft. He simultaneously helped establish the U.S. Navy Task Force Climate Change and served as its deputy director, managing all Navy policy and plans regarding climate change impacts to facilities, and strategic plans, and capability development, with a focus on the Arctic and henceforth authoring the U.S. Navy Arctic Roadmap of 2010.  

Leaving direct CNO staff for two years, Gallaudet served as the Superintendent/Commanding Officer of the Naval Observatory from 2011-2013, commanding a team of over 100 atomic physicists, astrophysicists, astronomers, mathematicians and engineers who develop, maintain, and modernize the DoD’s precision time keeping and astrometric observing capabilities. The Master Clock atomic clock ensemble and telescope data processing computers at the US Naval Observatory are designated national critical infrastructure because all US satellites, ballistic missiles, and national defense and economic computer networks would fail to operate without the information they provide.

Gallaudet then returned to CNO staff as Deputy Oceanographer of the Navy, eventually working his way up to promotion as the Head Oceanographer of the Navy in D.C. while simultaneously serving as the Hydrographer of the Navy and Commander of the Naval Meteorology and Oceanography Command (CNMOC) at the Stennis Space Center.

Gallaudet retired from the Navy in July 2017.

NOAA service
On October 25, 2017, after being confirmed by the U.S. Senate, Gallaudet took office as Assistant Secretary of Commerce for Oceans and Atmosphere within the U.S. Department of Commerce. The University Corporation for Atmospheric Research, a nonprofit consortium of more than 100 colleges and universities providing research and training in the atmospheric and related sciences, supported Gallaudet's nomination.

The Under Secretary of Commerce for Oceans and Atmosphere is appointed by the President of the United States with the consent of the United States Senate to serve at the pleasure of the President. In this function, he fulfilled the role of Acting Under Secretary of Commerce for Oceans and Atmosphere and Acting Administrator of the National Oceanic and Atmospheric Administration. He led the agency of 20,000 federal employees in managing and carrying out NOAA's regular operations, including managing the nation's fisheries, coastal resources and waterways, weather satellites and weather services. Gallaudet also oversaw the agency's annual budget of over $5 billion and various acts and initiatives covered by this budget, including but not limited to the Weather Research and Forecasting Innovation Act, the Commercial Weather Data Pilot program, the launch of several satellites and collaboration between NOAA and the US Navy on Arctic sea ice forecasting.

During his time at NOAA, Gallaudet led the agency's Blue Economy activities, aiming to advance marine transportation, sustainable seafood production, ocean exploration and mapping and marine tourism.  He directed NOAA's support to the Administration's INDOPACOM-Pacific Strategy; oversaw NOAA's Arctic research, operations, and engagement; and, led the execution of the NOAA science and technology strategies for Artificial Intelligence, Uncrewed Systems, 'Omics, Cloud, Data, and Citizen Science.

In February 2019, Gallaudet was replaced as Acting NOAA Administrator by Neil Jacobs while still remaining as the Assistant Secretary of Commerce for Oceans and Atmosphere. At the time of the announcement, the Senate has yet to confirm a permanent administrator for NOAA.

Ocean STL Consulting, LLC. 
Currently, Gallaudet is head of his own consulting company titled "Ocean STL Consulting, LLC", wherein the 'STL' stands for science, technology, and leadership, the three leading tenets of the company. The goal of Ocean STL is for Gallaudet to be able to use his past experience in the private and public sectors all throughout his Naval service and service to the U.S. government to assist entities in making educated decisions about their leadership direction, and pursued partnerships.

References

External links

 Biography at National Oceanic and Atmospheric Administration
 Biography at the U.S. Navy

Living people
United States Naval Academy alumni
Scripps Institution of Oceanography alumni
American oceanographers
National Oceanic and Atmospheric Administration personnel
Trump administration personnel
United States Navy rear admirals
1967 births
United States Navy rear admirals (lower half)